Raymond Or Ching-fai, SBS, JP (born 1949 in Xiamen, Fujian, China) is the Vice-Chairman of G-Resources Group ( and the Vice-Chairman and Chief Executive Officer of China Strategic Group, and the chairman of Esprit Holdings.

He was the Vice-Chairman and Chief Executive Officer of Hang Seng Bank, from which he retired in May 2009, and was succeeded by Margaret Leung Ko May-yee.

Early life
In 1949, Or was born in Xiamen, Fujian Province, China. In 1956, Or emigrated to Hong Kong.

Education
In 1972, Or graduated with a Bachelor of Social Sciences degree in Economics and Psychology from the University of Hong Kong.

Career
In 1972, Or started working at HSBC. In 1980, Or was promoted to Credit Manager in Corporate Banking Division at HSBC. In 1995, Or was promoted to Assistant General Manager and Head of Corporate and Institutional Banking at HSBC. In 2000, Or was appointed to General Manager and then Group General Manager at HSBC.

In 2005, Or was appointed to Vice-Chairman and Chief Executive of Hang Seng Bank. In 2009, Or retired from Hang Seng Bank.

References

Alumni of King's College, Hong Kong
Alumni of the University of Hong Kong
Hong Kong businesspeople
Hong Kong chief executives
HSBC people
People from Xiamen
Hong Kong financial businesspeople
Hong Kong bankers
1949 births
Living people
Businesspeople from Fujian
Members of the Election Committee of Hong Kong, 2007–2012
Recipients of the Silver Bauhinia Star